Nicolas Soret (end of the 16th century in Reims – begin of the 17th century) was a French catholic priest, poet and playwright. In 1606, he published La Ceciliade, ou le Martyre sanglant de sainte Cecile, patronne des musiciens, choirs set in music by Abraham Blondet, Paris, Rezé, 1606.

On 9 May 1624, he had L'Élection divine de Saint Nicolas à l'archevêché de Myre avec un sommaire de sa vie presented at Reims.

Bibliography 
 Abbé Jean-Baptiste-Joseph Boulliot, Biographie ardennaise ou Histoire des Ardennais qui se sont fait remarquer par leurs écrits, leurs actions, leurs vertus ou leurs erreurs, Paris, 1830, vol.2, p. 388-389 .
 Collectif, Biographie universelle, ancienne et moderne, Paris, au bureau de la Biographie universelle, 1849, vol.82, p. 377

External links 
 Nicolas Soret
 Text of La Ceciliade
 Nicolas Soret on CÉSAR

Writers from Reims
17th-century French dramatists and playwrights
17th-century French male writers
Year of birth missing
Year of death missing
Clergy from Reims